Atha is a genus of moth.

Atha may also refer to:

People
Bernard Atha (born 1928), Lord Mayor of Leeds, England, and occasional film actor
Bob Atha (born 1960), American footballer
Dick Atha (born 1931), American basketball player
Michael Wayne Atha (born 1979), American rapper known as Yelawolf
Rob Atha (born 1986), English table football player
Stuart Atha (born 1962), Air Marshall in Royal Air Force

Other
 Atha (MV), see Boats of the Mackenzie River watershed